Sri Siddhartha Institute of Business Management (SSIBM), formerly Sri Siddhartha Institute Management Studies (SSIMS), is management school located in Tumkur, Karnataka, India. It was established in 1997 under by the Sri Siddhartha Education Society and is still maintained by the society.

Courses
SSIBM offers courses Bachelor of Business Management and Master of Commerce courses. It is affiliated to Tumkur University and recognised by the AICTE.

College Festivals
 Dazzle - 2012

References

External links
 

Business schools in Karnataka
Universities and colleges in Tumkur district
Tumkur